Francobollo, are a Swedish indie rock band from Lund, Sweden made up of Simon Nilsson, Petter Grevelius, Sam Bailey and Sean Bean.

in 2016 they signed to Charlie Andrew's label Square Leg Records. The band have since released three singles, five official videos, one EP, and one album. They have toured with bands including The Big Moon & Marika Hackman.

The band's debut album, Long Live Life was released on July 14. To coincide with the album's release, the band announced a 20+ date headline tour of the UK and Europe.

Discography

Albums

Extended plays

References

Swedish indie rock groups
Musical groups established in 2010
People from Lund
2010 establishments in Sweden